Tse-yun Feng suggested the use of degree of parallelism to classify various computer architecture. It is based on sequential and parallel operations at a bit and word level.

About degree of parallelism

Maximum degree of parallelism 

The maximum number of binary digits that can be processed within a unit time by a computer system is called the maximum parallelism degree P. If a processor is processing P bits in unit time, then P is called the maximum
degree of parallelism.

Average degree of parallelism 

Let i= 1, 2, 3, ..., T be the different timing instants and P1, P2, ..., PT be the corresponding bits processed.
Then,
      Average parallelism, Pa = (P1 + P2 + ....PT) / T

Processor utilization 

 Processor utilization, μ= Pa/P

The maximum degree of parallelism depends on the structure of the arithmetic and logic unit. Higher degree of parallelism indicates a highly parallel ALU or processing element. Average parallelism depends on both the hardware and the software. Higher average parallelism can be achieved through concurrent programs.

Types of classification 
According to Feng's classification, computer architecture can be classified into four. The classification is based on the way contents stored in memory are processed. The contents can be either data or instructions.

 Word serial bit serial (WSBS)
 Word serial bit parallel (WSBP)
 Word parallel bit serial (WPBS)
 Word parallel bit parallel (WPBP)

Word serial bit serial (WSBS)
One bit of one selected word is processed at a time. This represents serial processing and needs maximum processing time.

Word serial bit parallel (WSBP) 

It is found in most existing computers and has been called "word slice" processing because one word of one bit is processed at a time. All bits of a selected word are processed at a time. Bit parallel means all bits of a word.

Word parallel bit serial (WPBS) 
It has been called bit slice processing because m-bit slice is processed at a time. Word parallel signifies selection of all words. It can be considered as one bit from all words are processed at a time.

Word parallel bit parallel

Limitations of Feng's classification 
It fails to project the concurrency in pipeline processors, as degree of parallelism doesn't account for concurrency handle by pipe-lined design.

See also
 Händler's  (ECS)
 Flynn's taxonomy

References

Computer architecture